Charlie Ballard (born 23 July 1999) is a professional Australian rules footballer playing for the Gold Coast Suns in the Australian Football League (AFL).

Early life
Charlie participated in the Auskick program at Mitcham, South Australia.

Ballard played in their under-18 premiership for the Sturt Football Club in the SANFL as well as for Sacred Heart College. Ballard averaged 18 disposals on the wing in the 2017 AFL Under 18 Championships, playing for South Australia. He ran 3.05 seconds in the  sprint at the AFL Draft Combine, and was touted as a top-30 selection at the 2017 AFL draft.

AFL career
Ballard was selected by Gold Coast with pick 42, their 3rd-round selection.

He made his AFL debut in round 7 of the 2018 season, in the nine-point loss against the Western Bulldogs at Mars Stadium. He kicked one goal on debut.

On debut, Ballard was praised by coach Stuart Dew, along with fellow debutant Brayden Crossley.

Statistics
 Statistics are correct to the end of round 3, 2022

|-
|- style="background-color: #EAEAEA"
! scope="row" style="text-align:center" | 2018
|style="text-align:center;"|
| 31 || 11 || 1 || 2 || 79 || 34 || 113 || 39 || 15 || 0.1 || 0.2 || 7.2 || 3.1 || 10.3 || 3.5 || 1.4 || 0
|-
! scope="row" style="text-align:center" | 2019
|style="text-align:center;"|
| 10 || 21 || 0 || 1 || 211 || 63 || 274 || 111 || 23 || 0.0 || 0.0 || 10.0 || 3.0 || 13.0 || 5.3 || 1.1 || 0
|- style="background-color: #EAEAEA"
! scope="row" style="text-align:center" | 2020
|style="text-align:center;"|
| 10 || 16 || 0 || 0 || 114 || 44 || 158 || 68 || 13 || 0.0 || 0.0 || 7.1 || 2.8 || 9.9 || 4.3 || 0.8 || 0
|-
! scope="row" style="text-align:center" | 2021
|style="text-align:center;"|
| 10 || 21 || 0 || 0 || 227 || 61 || 288 || 140 || 25 || 0.0 || 0.0 || 10.8 || 2.9 || 13.7 || 6.7 || 1.2 || 3
|- style="background-color: #EAEAEA"
! scope="row" style="text-align:center" | 2022
|style="text-align:center;"|
| 10 || 3 || 0 || 0 || 26 || 4 || 30 || 15 || 5 || 0.0 || 0.0 || 8.7 || 1.3 || 10.0 || 5.0 || 1.7 || TBA
|-
|- class="sortbottom"
! colspan=3| Career
! 72
! 1
! 3
! 657
! 206
! 863
! 373
! 81
! 0.0
! 0.0
! 9.1
! 2.9
! 12.0
! 5.2
! 1.1
! 3
|}

Notes

References

External links

Australian rules footballers from South Australia
Sturt Football Club players
1999 births
Living people
Gold Coast Football Club players
People educated at Sacred Heart College, Adelaide